This article lists players who have captained the senior Dublin county football team in the Leinster Senior Football Championship (SFC) and the All-Ireland Senior Football Championship (SFC). Unlike other counties the captain is not chosen from the club that has won the Dublin Senior Football Championship (SFC).

List of captains

Gaelic football
 
Dublin